Hardin Northern High School is a public high school in Dola, Ohio.  It is the only high school in the Hardin Northern Local School district.  It serves the villages of Dunkirk and Dola.  Their mascot is the  Polar Bears.  They are a member of the Northwest Central Conference.

Ohio High School Athletic Association State Championships

 Boys Football – 2004

References

External links
 District Website

High schools in Hardin County, Ohio
Public high schools in Ohio